Dianne "Di" Bates (born 20 March 1948) is an Australian writer and teacher .

Bates was born in Sydney and spent her early years in Appin, New South Wales, attending Campbelltown Performing Arts High School. Later she undertook teaching training in Wollongong where she received a Diploma of Teaching, since gaining a Bachelor of Arts at the University of Wollongong.

While teaching, Bates began her writing career with her first book, Terri, published by Penguin Books in 1980. Since then, she has published over 140 books, mostly for young readers. Some of these books have won state and national awards; others have been translated into French, Danish and German. Her junior verse novel, Nobody's Boy and junior novel, The Shape, have won CBCA Notable Awards.

Bates has received Grants and Fellowships from the Literature Board of the Australia Council for the Arts and has toured for the National Book Council.

Bates has undertaken commissioned writing for a large number of organisations and has worked on the editorial team of the New South Wales Department of Education School Magazine. She was co-editor of a national children's magazine, Puffinalia (Penguin Books) and editor of another national magazine, Little Ears.

Bates has founded several sub-branches of the Children's Book Council of Australia (CBCA) of NSW. She has presented community radio and television programs about children's literature and reviewed books in numerous magazines. She has also worked as a regional newspaper editor.

In 2008, Bates was awarded The Lady Cutler Prize for distinguished services to children's Literature.

Bates is married to prize-winning YA author, Bill Condon, whose awards include the Prime Minister's Literary Award in the inaugural category of young adult fiction and two CBCA Honor Books of the Year. She lives in Wollongong, NSW where she works as a freelance writer and manuscript assessor and writes a popular blog Writing for Children.

Awards and Commendations
 1987 Writer's Fellowship from the Literature Board of the Australia Council
 1988 Writer's Fellowships from the Literature Board of the Australia Council
 1988 West Australian Young Readers' Book Award (Grandma Cadbury's Trucking Tales)
 1993 Special Award, Australian Multicultural Children's Literature Award (I'm An Australian: A Classroom Journal)
 1995 Varuna Writers’ Centre Fellowship
 1999 Kids' Own Australian Literature Award (Desert Dan the Dunnyman)
 2000 Varuna Writers’ Centre Fellowship
 2001 Children's Book Council of Australia Notable Book (The Shape)
 2002 Kids Own Australian Literature Award Hall of Fame (Big Bad Bruce)
 2008 Lady Cutler award for distinguished services to children's literature
 2013 Children's Book Council of Australia Notable Book (Nobody's Boy)

Published Books

 The Year I Was Born 1983 (Moondrake, 1993) 
 The Year I Was Born 1984 (Moondrake, 1993) 
 A Gaggle of Giggles (Phoenix Education, 2015) 
 A Game of Keeps (Celapene Press, 2014) 
 Awesome Cats (Big Sky Publishing, 2015) 
 Awesome Dogs (Big Sky Publishing, 2015) 
 Awesome Horses (Big Sky Publishing, 2016) 
 A Night at Benny’s (Harcourt Brace, 1989) 
 A Tree House (CUP, 2008) 
 Aussie Kid Heroes (Interactive Publications, 2009) 
 Badu Boys Rule! (Insight Publications, 2006) 
 Belly Busters (Random House, 1994) 
 Belligrumble Bigfoot (Roo Books) about 1983
 Between You and Me (Pearson Education, 2003) 
 Big Bad Bruce illus Phoebe Middleton (A & R, 1994) 
 Big Bad Bruce illus Cheryll Johns (Koala Books, 2007) 
 Basil Bopp the Burper (Hodder Headline, 1996) 
 Basil Bopp the Burper (Five Senses Education, 2010). 
 Big Boss (Little Pink Dogs, 2020) 
 Billy Fishbone, King of the Kids (Hodder Headline, 1997) 
 Billy Fishbone, King of the Kids (Five Senses Education, 2010) 
 Blowflies and Glow-Worms (CUP, 2008) 
 Boys Only (No Girls) Otford Press, 2002) 
 Brad the Wonder Baby (Blake Education, 2000) 
 Bushranger Bob & the Nude Olympics (with Bill Condon) (Hodder Headline, 1999) 
 Bushranger Bob & the Nude Olympics (with Bill Condon) (Five Senses Education, 2010) 
 Bushrangers Teacher Source Book (Five Senses Education) 
 Candy in the Kitchen (Collins,1989) 
 Carl’s Café (Thomas Nelson, 2002) 
 Cassandra’s Clever Dad
 Champion Children (Heinemann Library, 1998) 
 Christmas Around the World (Macmillan) 
 Christmas Carols, Songs and Poems (Macmillan) 
 Christmas in Australia (Macmillan) 
 Christmas Make and Do (Macmillan) 
 Christmas Stories (Macmillan) 
 Cinderfella (Penguin, 2001) 
 Crossing the Line (Ford Street Publishing, 2008) 
 Crash Landing (Thomas Nelson, 2002) 
 Daisy’s Bedtime (Clavis Books, 2022)
 Dame Nellie Nickabocka, shooting Star (Hodder Headline, 1996) 
 Dame Nellie Nickabocka, shooting Star (Five Senses Education, 2010) 
 Daring Dora and the All-Girl Gang (Hodder Headline, 1996) 
 Daring Dora and the All-Girl Gang (Five Senses Education) 
 Dateless & Desperate (Pearson Education, 2002) 
 Desert Dan the Dunnyman (Hodder Headline, 1997) 
 Desert Dan the Dunnyman (Five Senses Education, 2010) 
 Erky Perky Silly Stuff (Five Senses Education, 2013) 
 Fangs (Thomas Nelson, 2002) 
 Famous & Fabulous Kids (Jacaranda Wiley, 1995) 
 Freaky Fact or Fiction (Hinkler Books 2011) 
 Getting Even (Rigby Heinemann, 1996) 
 Giggle and Grin (Five Senses Education, 2012) 
 Grandma Cadbury’s Bikie Gang (A&R, 1993) 
 Grandma Cadbury’s Safari Tours (A&R, 1989)  
 Grandma Cadbury’s Trucking Tales (A&R, 1987)  (WINNER 1988 WEST AUSTRALIAN YOUNG READERS’ BOOK AWARD)
 Grandma Cadbury’s Water World (Hodder Headline, 1997) 
 Hairy Hannah and the Grandad Gang (Hodder Headline, 1997) 
 Hairy Hannah and the Grandad Gang (Five Senses Education, 2010) 
 Here Comes Trouble! (Dragon Tales Publishing, 2015) 
 How Christmas Began (Macmillan,1990) 
 How the Sun was Made: A Traditional Aboriginal Story
 How to Self-Edit (To Improve Your Writing) (Emerald Publishers, India, 2005) .
 How to Self-Edit (To Improve Your Writing) (Five Senses Education, 2009) 
 I’m An Australian: A Class Journal (Jacaranda Wiley, 1992)  (WINNER SPECIAL PRIZE 1993 MULTICULTURAL CHILDREN’S LITERATURE AWARD)
 In Big Trouble (Rigby, 1996) 
 Inventions (Heinemann Library, 1998) 
 Jacob Fang & His Feral Family (Hodder Headline, 1996) 
 Jacob Fang & His Feral Family (Five Senses Education, 2010) 
 Junk (CUP, 2008) 
 Justin’s Wells, illustrated by Tony Flowers (Rigby, 2007) 
 Kings of the Creek (Rigby, 2001) 
 Mad, Bad Jason (Austin Macauley, UK, 2020)
 Madcap Cafe & other humorous plays (with Bill Condon; Brooks Waterloo, 1986) 
 Making Friends on Beacon Street (Mimosa, 1992) 
 Money Smart Kids (Ibis, 2005) 
 My Family (CUP, 2008) 
 My Other Mother (Rigby Heinemann, 1996) 
 My Wacky Gran (Angus & Robertson, 1994) / also  (1997)
 Ned the Nong & the Kelly Kids (with Bill Condon) (Hodder Headline, 1999) 
 Ned the Nong & the Kelly Kids (with Bill Condon) (Five Senses Education, 2010) 
 Nick Knickers & The Great Santa Round-up (with Bill Condon) (Hodder Headline, 1999) 
 Nick Knickers & The Great Santa Round-up (with Bill Condon) Five Senses Education, 2010)
 Nobody’s Boy (Celapene Press, 2012) 
 Operation Lily-Liver (with Bill Condon, 1987) 
 Our Home is Dirt by Sea (a poetry anthology, Walker Books Australia, 2016) 
 Out of the Blue (Pearson Education, 2005)
 Piggy Moss (Puffin, 1982) 
 Promise Not to Laugh (Angus & Robertson, 1996)  (with Chris McTrustry)
 Resourceful Kids (Rigby, 1997) 
 Revise, Edit & Re-Write (Ashton Scholastic, 1994) 
 Rotten Rellies (Nelson, 1997) 
 Schools at War! (Random House, 1997) 
 Scrum O’Crum & the Bushranger Babes (Hodder Headline, 1997) 
 Scrum O’Crum & the Bushranger Babes (Five Senses Education, 2010) 
 Skin and Bones (CUP, 2008) 
 Stagestruck! (plays with Bill Condon; HBJ, 1992) 
 Supermouth (Rigby, 1995) 
 Terri (Puffin, 1981) 
 The Adventures of Jellybean, with Bill Condon (UQP, 2018) 
 The Belligrumble Bigfoot (Roo Books, 1984) 
 The Bogeyman in the Garden (Longman, 1995) 
 The Boy Who Loved Chocolate (Omnibus, 1990) 
 The Butti Butti Bunyip, illustrated by Greg Holfield (Omnibus Books, 2015) 
 The Case of the Kidnapped Brat with Bill Condon (Reed Mystery Mammoth, 1995) 
 The Curse of King Nevertrustme (Angus & Robertson, 1995) 
 The Funnies: Cartoons and Comics (Jacaranda Press, 1993) 
 The Girl in the Basement (Morris Publishing Australia, 2013) 
 The Hold-Up Heroes (National Museum of Australia, 2005) 
 The Last Refuge (Hodder Headline, 1996) 
 The Little Red Hen, infants’ play (Macmillan, 1987) 
 The Magician (Rigby,1988) 
 The Musicians of Bremen, infants’ play (Macmillan, 1987) 
 The Pobblebonk Frog (CUP, 2008) 
 The Trouble with Parents (Supa Dupas, 1997)
 The New Writer’s Survival Guide (Penguin,1989) 
 The Shape (Allen and Unwin, 2000) 
 The Worst Cook in the World (Nelson, 1987) 
 The Slacky Flat Gang (with Bill Condon; Brooks Waterloo, 1988) 
 Thirteen Going on Forty (Hodder Headline)
 To the Moon and Back (Big Sky Publishing, 2017) 
 Top Tasty Treats (Jacaranda, 1993) 
 Treasure Seekers (Longman, 2001) 
 Troublemaker (Addison Wesley Longman 1996)  + (Sundance, 1997) 
 The Trouble with Parents (Longman, 1996)  + (Scholastic, Canada, 2001) 
 The Worst Cook in the World (Nelson, 1987) 
 Thirteen Going on Forty (Hodder & Stoughton, 1986) 
 Top Tasty Treats (Jacaranda Press, 1993) 
 Treasure Seekers (Pearson Education, 2001)  (with Ann C Whitehead & Bill Condon)
 Troublemaker (Longman, 1995) 
 Urgent Delivery (Thomas Nelson, 2002) 
 Villains ((Heinemann Library, 1996) 
 When Melissa-Ann Came to Dinner (Harcourt Brace, 1989) 
 Whales (CUP, 2008) 
 Wild and Wacky Adventurers with Bill Condon (IP Kidz, 2022)
 We Care for Our School (Landmark, NZ, 1996) 
 Who Pushed Humpty? (with Mary Small, illustrated Craig Smith, Mimosa,1992) 
 Wordgames (Longman Cheshire, 1993) 
 Wordgames (Five Senses Education, 2009) 
 Writing Essentials: A Teacher’s Guide to Grammar, Punctuation & Word Usage (Hawker Brownlow, 2017) 
 Your Teeth (CUP, 2008) 
 Zoo Animals (CUP, 2008)

References 

Living people
1948 births
Australian women writers
Australian writers